Agios Georgios ( meaning Saint George) is a village in the western part of the Karditsa regional unit, Greece. Agios Georgios is part of the municipal unit of Mitropoli. It is located near the foot of the mountains of Agrafa, 11 km southeast of Karditsa. Its residents are based in agriculture.

Population

External links
 Agios Georgios on GTP Travel Pages

See also

List of settlements in the Karditsa regional unit

References

Populated places in Karditsa (regional unit)